Florida Libraries began publication in July, 1949. It is the official journal of the Florida Library Association and is published bi-annually.  The journal publishes articles related to librarianship in Florida, and while some of them are scholarly, others will be informal in tone and content. The journal has an open access policy, meaning that it is available freely upon publication.  Past issues are archived on their website, and they are available in pdf format. 

The journal accepts manuscripts from librarians throughout the Southeastern United States, but gives preference to submissions from librarians affiliated with Florida libraries and institutions. Part of the journal's mission is to create a space for Florida librarians to be published, as well as to provide support for the region's professionals with its content. Articles include "original research, case studies, literature reviews, reflective essays, conference reports, student scholarship, and book reviews." Articles cover challenges and ideas regarding librarianship in public, academic, and special collections settings. Articles also cover archival resources in Florida.

References

Biannual journals
English-language journals
Library science journals